The Roller Derby World Cup is an international women's roller derby tournament formerly organized by Blood & Thunder magazine, and currently organized by the Roller Derby World Cup Committee. Teams of amateur skaters from around the world compete for their respective nations.

History
The inaugural 2011 Roller Derby World Cup was hosted by Toronto Roller Derby, and was held December 1 through 4, 2011, at The Bunker at Downsview Park in Toronto, Ontario, Canada. It was won by Team USA, who beat Team Canada by a score of 336 points to 33 in the final. Live online coverage of the  event was broadcast on the Derby News Network. 

The 2014 Roller Derby World Cup took place December 4 through 7, 2014, in Dallas, Texas. Team USA repeated their victory, this time defeating Team England in the final 219–105. For the 2014 event, the complete live online coverage was broadcast by Blood and Thunder magazine, through the official Roller Derby World Cup website.

The 2018 Roller Derby World Cup was held in early February 2018, hosted by Rainy City Roller Derby, in Greater Manchester, England. On this occasion, USA Roller Derby defeated Team Australia (roller derby) in the final.

Results

References

External links
 Official Roller Derby World Cup – info page

 
Recurring sporting events established in 2011
Roller derby competitions
Derby